Lucid Games Limited is a British video game developer based in Liverpool. The studio was founded in February 2011 by former employees of Bizarre Creations, which had been shut down a week earlier. Notable games developed by Lucid Games include Geometry Wars 3: Dimensions (2014) and Destruction AllStars (2021).

History 
Lucid Games was founded by Mark Craig, Andy Davidson, Chris Davie, Nick Davies, Craig Howard, Jeff Lewis, Paul Morrissey, Pete O'Brien, Pete Wallace, and Chad Wright. Most of them had previously been employed at the developer Bizarre Creations in various capacities, including Wallace as development manager and O'Brien as senior producer. Following the poor commercial performance of its game Blur, Bizarre Creations' parent company, Activision, had sought to sell the studio but was unsuccessful in finding a buyer, consequently announcing in January 2011 that it would shut down the studio. According to Wallace, Bizarre Creations' staff had been aware of impending layoffs but had not expected the studio to be closed. Bizarre Creations was disestablished on 18 February 2011, leaving 200 people unemployed. Lucid Games was subsequently formed in Liverpool on 21 February 2011. Wallace and Davidson became the new company's managing director and commercial director, respectively. The establishment was supported by Liverpool Vision, a local economic development company that sought to keep Bizarre Creations' talent in the Liverpool area. Wallace stated that he intended for Lucid Games to "get back to the levels of innovation and creativity at Bizarre [Creations] that made Activision so keen to acquire it" and hoped to employ up to fifty former Bizarre Creations staff. Within its first year, the company grew from eight employees to twenty-eight and moved from a temporary office to a permanent one in the Liverpool city centre.

Lucid Games hired Brian Woodhouse, Bizarre Creations' former studio director, as head business development in July 2016. By 2019, after eight years of expansion, the company had grown past 100 employees. In October 2020, Lucid Games and its separately held publishing arm, Lucid Publishing, were organised as subsidiaries of Lucid Group Entertainment. By June 2021, Lucid Games employed 150 people.

Games developed

References

External links 
 

2011 establishments in England
British companies established in 2011
Companies based in Liverpool
Privately held companies of England
Video game companies established in 2011
Video game companies of the United Kingdom
Video game development companies